Harriott is an English surname.

People

 Ainsley Harriott, English celebrity chef
 Andrew Harriott, Australian cricketer
 Darren Harriott, British comedian
 Joe Harriott, Jamaican jazz musician
 Claude Harriott, Jamaican sportsperson
 Derrick Harriott, Jamaican reggae musician
 John Edward Harriott, Canadian fur trader